Fear of frogs and toads is both a specific phobia, known simply as frog phobia or ranidaphobia (from ranidae, the most widespread family of frogs), and a superstition common to the folkways of many cultures. Psychiatric speciality literature uses the simple term "fear of frogs" rather than any specialized term. The term batrachophobia has also been recorded in a 1953 psychiatric dictionary.

Popular beliefs
According to some, the sight of a frog may be a bad omen. As well, a common myth says that touching frogs and toads may give one warts. (In many other cultures, frogs are considered a good omen.) A survey carried out by researchers from the Johannesburg Zoo have shown that in modern times old superstitions play a less significant role and modern children are more concerned whether frogs are poisonous or harmless.

As a phobia
Phobia against frogs often happens after seeing frogs die violently. One case of severe fear of frogs has been described in Journal of Behavior Therapy and Experimental Psychiatry in 1983: a woman developed an extreme fear of frogs after a traumatic incident in which her lawn mower ran over a group of frogs and killed them.

Portuguese shopkeepers are using ceramic frogs to deter Roma people.

See also
List of phobias

References

Zoophobias
Frogs
Superstitions